Rubus loxensis is a species of flowering plant in the blackberry genus Rubus, family Rosaceae. It is native to Ecuador, Peru and Bolivia. Its closest relative is Rubus adenothallus.

References

loxensis
Flora of Ecuador
Flora of Peru
Flora of Bolivia
Plants described in 1844